Fernando Ferreira (born 22 January 1952) is a Portuguese racing cyclist. He rode in the 1975 Tour de France.

References

1952 births
Living people
Portuguese male cyclists
Place of birth missing (living people)